Jean-Louis Bourlanges (born 13 July 1946) is a French politician who has represented the 12th constituency of the Hauts-de-Seine department in the National Assembly since 2017. A member of the Democratic Movement (MoDem), he has presided over the Committee on Foreign Affairs of the National Assembly since 2021.

Bourlanges previously served as Member of the European Parliament (MEP) from 1989 to 2007. He was elected on the Union for French Democracy (UDF) list and sat with the Alliance of Liberals and Democrats for Europe group.

He is a graduate of the Paris Institute of Political Studies (better known as Sciences Po), where he is currently an associate professor.

Political career

Early career in local politics
Bourlanges, a graduate of the École nationale d'administration who was appointed an auditor of the Court of Audit in 1979, was a municipal councillor of Dieppe (1983–1989) and regional councillor of Haute-Normandie (1986–1998).

Member of the European Parliament, 1989–2007
During his time as a Member of the European Parliament, Bourlanges served on the Committee on Transport and Tourism (1989–1993), the Committee on Budgetary Control (1993–1999), the Committee on Budgets (1994–2002) and the Committee on International Trade (2005–2007), among others. From 2003 until 2004 he chaired the Committee on Civil Liberties, Justice and Home Affairs.

Following the 2004 European elections, Bourlanges was instrumental in establishing the Alliance of Liberals and Democrats for Europe group in the European Parliament. In 2007, he left his parliamentary seat two years before the next elections. He was succeeded in the European Parliament by Brigitte Fouré.

Ahead of the 2007 French presidential election, Bourlanges was a vocal critic of efforts made by the Socialist Party's candidate Ségolène Royal to seek the endorsement of his party, the Union for French Democracy. In the second round of the election, he supported Nicolas Sarkozy of the Union for a Popular Movement.

Later career
Bourlanges was a regular contributor to the radio broadcast L'Esprit public on France Culture until 2017.

Return to politics
Following the 2012 French legislative election, Bourlanges supported Jean-Louis Borloo's initiative to establish the new centre-right Union of Democrats and Independents party.

Ahead of the 2017 presidential election, Bourlanges quit his role as a radio commentator and publicly endorsed Emmanuel Macron. He was critical of the Union of Democrats and Independents' support of The Republicans nominee François Fillon.

Member of the National Assembly, 2017–present
In the 2017 election for the National Assembly, Bourlanges was elected as the Member of Parliament for Hauts-de-Seine's 12th constituency with the support of La République En Marche! as a member of the Democratic Movement. In Parliament, he has since been serving on the Committee on Foreign Affairs and the Committee on European Affairs. From 2017 until 2019, he was also a member of the Finance Committee. Since 2019, she has also been a member of the French delegation to the Franco-German Parliamentary Assembly.

In July 2019, Bourlanges voted in favour of the French ratification of the European Union's Comprehensive Economic and Trade Agreement (CETA) with Canada.

In January 2021, he was elected to succeed Marielle de Sarnez at the presidency of the Foreign Affairs Committee.

In May 2022, Bourlanges was a notable critic of the appointment of Pap Ndiaye as Education Minister in the government of Prime Minister Élisabeth Borne by President Emmanuel Macron. The following month, he won reelection to a second term in the National Assembly in the 2022 legislative election.

Other activities
 Institut français des relations internationales (Ifri), Member of the Board of Directors
 Jacques Delors Institute, Member of the Advisory Board
 Trilateral Commission, Member of the European Group

References

External links

1946 births
Living people
Sciences Po alumni
École nationale d'administration alumni
Judges of the Court of Audit (France)
People from Neuilly-sur-Seine
Politicians from Île-de-France
MEPs for North-West France 2004–2009
MEPs for France 1989–1994
MEPs for France 1994–1999
MEPs for France 1999–2004
Union for French Democracy MEPs
Deputies of the 15th National Assembly of the French Fifth Republic
Deputies of the 16th National Assembly of the French Fifth Republic
Union for French Democracy politicians
Democratic Movement (France) politicians
Members of Parliament for Hauts-de-Seine